Toronto Public Health (TPH) is the public health unit in Toronto, Ontario. It is responsible for delivering public health programs and services, enforcing public health regulations and advising Toronto City Council on health issues. The current unit was formed in 1998, when the former Metropolitan Toronto and its constituent municipalities of Toronto, York, North York, Scarborough, Etobicoke, and East York amalgamated into the current city of Toronto.

Role 
In Ontario, under the Health Protection and Promotion Act, a public health unit (PHU) is an official health agency established by a municipality. PHUs administer health promotion and disease prevention programs to inform the public about healthy life-styles, communicable disease control, immunization, food premises inspection, healthy growth and development, health education for all age groups, and selected screening services.

Health units are governed by a board of health, which is an autonomous corporation under the act and is administered by the Medical Officer of Health, who reports to the board of health.

Programs

Dinesafe 
In 2001, under then medical officer of health Dr. Sheela Basrur, TPH introduced Dinesafe, the City of Toronto's food safety program which inspects restaurants for compliance with health regulations, and publicly displays results (pass, conditional pass or closed) both on-site and on the City's website.

Infectious disease control

SARS 
During the Severe acute respiratory syndrome (SARS) crisis in 2003, TPH under then medical officer of health Dr. Sheela Basrur lead the City of Toronto's response to the virus. TPH created a management system, with different operational teams responsible for different parts of the response. TPH teams monitored those infected and under quarantine, were responsible for epidemiology, tracing the movements and contacts of those infected, and tracking the virus itself. Much of the public communications effort was also led by TPH, who organized community meetings, contacted school boards, and kept the population informed. As a result of SARS, TPH "totally reorganized itself", with a stronger liaison unit with acute-care facilities and changes being made to better address public health on a provincial and federal level.

COVID-19 

TPH is responsible for coordinating the City of Toronto's response to the international outbreak of COVID-19. On January 7, 2020, TPH was informed of a "undiagnosed viral pneumonia" in Wuhan, China, and began to monitor and develop a response plan should it spread to Toronto. TPH released a statement on January 21 that it was "actively monitoring" the virus. On March 19, 2020, TPH ordered restaurants and bars to halt dine-in service amid evidence of community spread.

Board of Health 
The Board of Health is a committee of the City of Toronto, governed by the Health Protection and Promotion Act, which directs and oversees the work of Toronto Public Health. It is composed of six city council members, six members of the public, and one education representative. A chair and vice-chair are elected from amongst its members.

Medical Officer of Health
The Medical Officer of Health is responsible for day-to-day operations of Toronto Public Health, and reports to Toronto City Council through the Board of Health.

See also
Health in Toronto
Toronto Paramedic Services

References

External links 
 
 An Infectious Idea: 125 Years of Public Health in Toronto (City of Toronto Archives)

Municipal government of Toronto
Public health organizations
Medical and health organizations based in Ontario
Health in Toronto